Kundryuchya is a river in the Rostov Oblast of Russia and the Luhansk Oblast of Ukraine.

The Kundryuchya rises on the Donets Ridge in the Ukrainian Luhansk Oblast. It flows east into Russia's Rostov Oblast, cutting a deep valley into the mountainous region. The river is mainly fed by snowmelt. Between late November and mid-March, the river is covered by a layer of ice. The river has a length of 244 km and drains an area of 2320 km2. The town of Krasny Sulin lies on the course of the river.

References

Rivers of Luhansk Oblast
Rivers of Rostov Oblast